Smyle (pronounced "smile") is the second commercial mixtape by American hip hop recording artist Kyle. It features guest appearances from Chance the Rapper, Jesse Rutherford and Yuna. It was released through Indie-Pop (independently popular.) on October 2, 2015.

Track listing

Charts

References

2015 mixtape albums
Kyle (musician) albums